Muhammad Bayazid Sarker (born 1 January 1971) is a Bangladeshi economic researcher and central banker. He has been working in Bangladesh Bank (BB) since 1999 and his current position is joint director in the Chief Economist's Unit. He is also an adjunct assistant professor of business school of Southeast University. In 2007, Sarker developed a theoretical structure of migrants’ sponsored bank [MSB] as an alternative source of external financing for developing economies like Bangladesh. The idea of MSB also presented by Sarker in Kuala Lumpur, April 15, 2008. According to Sarker's developed concept, MSB banking model is equally applicable for developing or emerging economies deficient in both capital and foreign exchange coupled having a good base of non-residents earning abroad.

Early life and education 
The sixth of nine children, Sarker was born on 1 January 1971 to a Muslim family in the village of Sarkerpara under Cahapai Nawabganj district, a west-northern part of Bangladesh. His father was Md. Latifur Rahman Sarker, a public health inspector, and his mother was Sekina Khatun. His early childhood was spent in the village. He finished his Master of Social Science in economics from Dhaka University in 1997. In 2010, Sarker was awarded Master of Public Policy from National Graduate Institute of Policy Studies [GRIPS], Tokyo. In 2012, Mr. Sarker also finished his MBA in international business from Dhaka University.

After graduation 
After his graduation, he engaged with some research works under Bangladesh Institute of Development Studies [BIDS] and couple of private research firms for two years. In March 1999 he joined in BB as an assistant director. In his central banking job, Sarker works in bank examination, foreign exchange, public debt management, risk management and banking regulation departments. During the central banking job, Sarker visited Malaysia, Singapore, Philippines and India for participating different international training and seminars.

His concept of migrants' sponsored banking  for encouraging self-dependency in development financing of emerging labor exporting countries. The idea partially implemented in Bangladesh.

Personal life 
In 2003, Sarker got married with Mahfuja Hoque Sarker. She works in a local private commercial bank. They have one son Ismail Sarker and one daughter Juwairyah Amreen Sarker. They reside in Banani, Dhaka.

References

  
 
 
 The daily Prothom Alo, March 27, 2013.p-12
 The daily Bonik Barta, April 02, 2013 p-7
 Cross border money demand function
 Privatization under private organization 
 

1971 births
Bangladeshi economists
Living people
University of Dhaka alumni